Clint Hester (born November 21, 1986) is an American professional boxer and mixed martial artist who last competed in 2016. A professional competitor since 2008, he fought in the UFC and was a contestant on The Ultimate Fighter: Team Jones vs. Team Sonnen.

Background
Hester is from Atlanta, Georgia. He often got into fights growing up, but was not an instigator rather defended several of his friends. Hester, who played football, had planned to play college football but decided to take a different path when he was not offered a scholarship.

Boxing career
Hester thought of joining the military after high school, but ultimately chose to start training in boxing and was coached by Willie D'Antignac, amassing an amateur record of 13–3. Hester turned professional in 2007 and lost his first bout by first-round knockout.  Hester fought six more times until his final fight in 2013.  When Hester's boxing gym closed down he searched for another gym to train at before finding X3 Sports MMA. Hester decided to make the switch to MMA.

Mixed martial arts career

Early career
Hester started his professional MMA career out at 2-0 before being offered a spot in an upcoming local Grand Prix. Hester won his opening round matchup via knockout. He lost in the next round of the tournament to future Bellator Fighting Championships welterweight title contender, Douglas Lima, via unanimous decision.

The Ultimate Fighter
In January 2013, it was announced that Hester was selected for The Ultimate Fighter: Team Jones vs. Team Sonnen.  Hester defeated Fraser Opie by decision to earn his way into the house. He was then selected as Jon Jones's first pick and second pick overall.

Hester had his preliminary fight against Team Sonnen's Jimmy Quinlan. Hester was upset in the second round via submission. Though Hester was a candidate for the wildcard, his coach, Jon Jones, ultimately picked Bubba McDaniel.

Ultimate Fighting Championship
Despite losing in the preliminaries, Hester was given a fight at the finale. Hester faced Bristol Marunde at The Ultimate Fighter 17 Finale. Hester won the back-and-forth fight via KO from a standing elbow in the third round.

Hester was expected to face Cezar Ferreira on August 3, 2013, at UFC 163.  However, on July 18, it was announced he was taken out of the bout due to an injury.

For his second UFC fight, Hester faced Dylan Andrews on December 7, 2013, at UFC Fight Night 33. He won the fight via TKO due to injury after Andrews dislocated his shoulder in the second round.

Hester faced Andy Enz on February 1, 2014, at UFC 169. He won the fight by unanimous decision.

Hester faced Antônio Braga Neto on June 28, 2014, at UFC Fight Night: Swanson vs. Stephens. He won the back and forth fight via split decision.

Hester faced Robert Whittaker November 8, 2014 at UFC Fight Night 55. He lost the fight via TKO in the second round; the first loss of his UFC career.  Despite the loss, Hester was awarded his first Fight of the Night bonus award for the bout.

Hester was expected to face Luke Barnatt on April 4, 2015, at UFC Fight Night 63. However, Hester pulled out of the fight in early March due to a broken foot.

Hester faced Vitor Miranda on August 1, 2015, at UFC 190. He lost the fight by TKO in the second round due to punches and elbows.

Hester next faced Marcos Rogério de Lima in a light heavyweight bout on April 23, 2016, at UFC 197. He lost the one sided fight via submission in the first round.

On June 3 Hester was released from the promotion.

Championships and accomplishments
Ultimate Fighting Championship
Fight of the Night (One time)

Mixed martial arts record

|-
|Loss
|align=center|11–6
|Marcos Rogério de Lima
|Submission (arm-triangle choke)
|UFC 197
|
|align=center|1
|align=center|4:35
|Las Vegas, Nevada, United States
|
|-
|Loss
|align=center|11–5
|Vitor Miranda
|TKO (punches and elbows)
|UFC 190
|
|align=center|2
|align=center|2:38
|Rio de Janeiro, Brazil
|
|-
|Loss
|align=center| 11–4
|Robert Whittaker
|TKO (knee and punches)
|UFC Fight Night: Rockhold vs. Bisping
|
|align=center|2
|align=center|2:43
|Sydney, Australia
|
|- 
|Win
|align=center| 11–3
|Antônio Braga Neto
|Decision (split)
|UFC Fight Night: Swanson vs. Stephens
|
|align=center|3
|align=center|5:00
|San Antonio, Texas, United States
|
|-
|Win
|align=center| 10–3
|Andy Enz
|Decision (unanimous)
|UFC 169
|
|align=center|3
|align=center|5:00
|Newark, New Jersey, United States
|
|-
|Win
|align=center| 9–3
|Dylan Andrews
|TKO (doctor stoppage)
|UFC Fight Night: Hunt vs. Bigfoot
|
|align=center|2
|align=center|5:00
|Brisbane, Australia
|
|-
|Win
|align=center| 8–3
|Bristol Marunde
|KO (elbow)
|The Ultimate Fighter: Team Jones vs. Team Sonnen Finale
|
|align=center|3
|align=center|3:53
|Las Vegas, Nevada, United States
|Return to Middleweight.
|-
|Win
|align=center| 7–3
|Patrick Miller
|TKO (punches)
|Wild Bill's Fight Night 47
|
|align=center|1
|align=center|3:41
|Duluth, Georgia, United States
|
|-
|Win
|align=center| 6–3
|Rashaun Spencer
|TKO (punches)
|Tabernacle Fight Party
|
|align=center|2
|align=center|1:27
|Atlanta, Georgia, United States
|
|-
|Win
|align=center| 5–3
|Tomar Washington
|Decision (unanimous)
|King of the Ring 3
|
|align=center|3
|align=center|5:00
|Atlanta, Georgia, United States
|
|-
|Loss
|align=center| 4–3
|Cale Yarbrough
|Submission (north-south choke)
|Wild Bill's Fight Night 31
|
|align=center|3
|align=center|1:18
|Duluth, Georgia, United States
|Light Heavyweight debut.
|-
|Win
|align=center| 4–2
|Tony Souza
|Submission (punches)
|Wild Bill's Fight Night 30
|
|align=center|2
|align=center|2:41
|Duluth, Georgia, United States
|
|-
|Loss
|align=center| 3–2
|Roger Carroll
|Submission (armbar)
|Bangkok Fight Night 5
|
|align=center|1
|align=center|2:19
|Atlanta, Georgia, United States
|
|-
|Loss
|align=center| 3–1
|Douglas Lima
|Decision (unanimous)
|Sin City Fight Club - Redline GP 2
|
|align=center|3
|align=center|5:00
|Atlanta, Georgia, United States
|
|-
|Win
|align=center| 3–0
|Aaron Johnson
|KO (punches)
|Sin City Fight Club - Redline GP 1
|
|align=center|1
|align=center|0:42
|Atlanta, Georgia, United States
|
|-
|Win
|align=center| 2–0
|Dymond Jones
|TKO (punches)
|Soco de Boss
|
|align=center|2
|align=center|4:27
|Atlanta, Georgia, United States
|
|-
|Win
|align=center| 1–0
|Aaron Johnson
|TKO (doctor stoppage)
|Wild Bill's Fight Night 17
|
|align=center|1
|align=center|1:18
|Atlanta, Georgia, United States
|

Professional boxing record

| style="text-align:center;" colspan="8"|3 Wins (2 knockouts, 1 decision), 3 Losses, 1 Draw
|-  style="text-align:center; background:#e3e3e3;"
|  style="border-style:none none solid solid; "|Res.
|  style="border-style:none none solid solid; "|Record
|  style="border-style:none none solid solid; "|Opponent
|  style="border-style:none none solid solid; "|Type
|  style="border-style:none none solid solid; "|Rd., Time
|  style="border-style:none none solid solid; "|Date
|  style="border-style:none none solid solid; "|Location
|  style="border-style:none none solid solid; "|Notes
|-
|Win
| align=center|3–3–1
|  Gary Lavender
| align=center|TKO
| align=center|4 (4), 2:35
| align=center|2012-07-08
|  Grand Ballroom, Atlanta, Georgia, United States
|
|-
|Win
| align=center|2–3–1
|  Tobias Rice
| align=center|Decision (Unanimous)
| align=center|4 (4), 3:00
| align=center|2011-12-02
|  World Congress Center, Atlanta, Georgia, United States
|
|-
|Loss
| align=center|1–3–1
|  Alexis Santos
| align=center|Decision (Split)
| align=center|4 (4), 3:00
| align=center|2011-02-26
|  Club Europe, Atlanta, Georgia, United States
|
|-
| style="background: #B0C4DE"|Draw
| align=center|1–2–1
|  Jabir Abdul Basit
| align=center|Draw
| align=center|4 (4), 3:00
| align=center|2009-07-03
|  Atlanta, Georgia, United States
|
|-
|Loss
| align=center|1–2–0
|  Evan Nedd
| align=center|TKO
| align=center|3 (4), 1:52
| align=center|2009-01-30
|  UVI Sports & Fitness Center, Charlotte Amalie,  U.S. Virgin Islands
|
|-
|Win
| align=center|1–1–0
|  Jeremy Thomas
| align=center|KO
| align=center|2 (4), 0:46
| align=center|2008-05-09
|  Center Stage, Atlanta, Georgia, United States
|
|-
|loss
| align=center|0–1–0
|  Francisco Alvarez
| align=center|KO
| align=center|1 (4), 2:26
| align=center|2007-09-14
|  Kissimmee Civic Center, Kissimmee, Florida, United States
|
|-

See also
 List of male mixed martial artists

References

External links
 
 
 

Sportspeople from Marietta, Georgia
American male mixed martial artists
1986 births
Living people
Mixed martial artists from Georgia (U.S. state)
Middleweight mixed martial artists
Mixed martial artists utilizing Brazilian jiu-jitsu
American practitioners of Brazilian jiu-jitsu
Ultimate Fighting Championship male fighters